The Technical University of Liberec is a university in the city of Liberec, Czech Republic. The university has undergone great transformation in its over sixty-year history. When it was founded, it was called the Institute of Mechanical Engineering in Liberec, and its original classrooms were located in the attics of the F. X. Šalda Grammar School. These later served as accommodation for teachers, and it was here that the first plans and ideas arose concerning the later form and direction of the college. The first 259 students were admitted on October 1, 1953.

Today, the university has seven faculties and one specialized institute:

Faculty of Mechanical Engineering, Faculty of Textile Engineering, Faculty of Science-Humanities and Education, Faculty of Economics, Faculty of Arts and Architecture, Faculty of Mechatronics, Informatics and Inter-Disciplinary Studies, Faculty of Health Studies, Institute for Nanomaterials, Advanced Technologies and Innovation

Academics 
The university offers courses in the humanities and sciences, as well as many technical subjects. Students can obtain  bachelor's, master's, or doctoral degrees. The Technical University of Liberec is a medium-sized institution.

Research 
The Institute for Nanomaterials, Advanced Technologies and Innovation has been a part of the Technical University of Liberec since 2012. Its 19 specialized laboratories aim to contribute to regional development and are traditionally oriented towards technical industries. Research programmes focus on materials research, nanomaterials and engineering, emphasizing applications.

Study 
Technical University of Liberec offers three bachelor's, eight master's, and seven doctoral programmes taught in English.

 Bachelor in System Engineering and Informatics (Nisa/Neisse University)
 Bachelor in Textile and Fashion Design, the only one in the Czech Republic
 Bachelor in Textile Technologies, Materials and Nanomaterials, the only one in the Czech Republic
 Bachelors in Economics, Management, & Business Administration, dual degree bachelor's programme with the University of Huddersfield
 Master in Electrical Engineering and Informatics, Mechatronics
 Masters in Architecture and Urban Design
 Masters in Economics and Management, dual degree bachelor's programme with the University of Huddersfield
 Masters in Mechanical Engineering & Innovation
 Masters in Mechanical Engineering, Machines & Equipment Design
 Masters in Mechanical Engineering, Technology, and Materials
 Masters in Textile & Clothing Engineering, the only one in the Czech Republic
 Masters in Textile Engineering, Nonwoven & Nanomaterials, the only one in the Czech Republic
 PhD in Applied Mechanics
 PhD in Electrical Engineering, Informatics, & Technical Cybernetics
 PhD in Machine and Equipment Design
 PhD in Manufacturing Systems and Processes
 PhD in Material Engineering
 PhD in System Engineering, Informatics, & Economics
 PhD in Textile Engineering, Textile Techniques & Materials Engineering

Successful students of economics are eligible to participate in the dual degree bachelor's programme with the University of Huddersfield, which was named University of the Year 2013.

The Faculty of Textile Engineering is the only institution in the Czech Republic that offers a complete education program in textiles.

Neisse University 
Neisse University is a unique inter-regional project between three partner universities — Hochschule Zittau/Görlitz, Politechnika Wroclawska and the Technical University of Liberec. It is available to Bachelor's degree students of Information and Communication Management course at the Faculty of Economics. Students of this programme spend one year at each university, experiencing different academic and cultural environments. They graduate from this multiple-degree programme with a diploma recognised in three European countries.

Accommodation 
The Residence Halls of the university have been evaluated as the best ones in the Czech Republic three years in succession; they are modern, comfortable, offer high-speed internet connection, excellent sport facilities, student clubs and medical services on-site.

Sports Center 
Students participate in sports and other activities, including tennis, football, badminton, wall-climbing, rope center, mini-golf, beach volleyball and spinning. University sports are under the administration of the Academic Sports Center, which is a part of the Faculty of Sciences, Humanities and Education.

References

External links
 Technical University of Liberec Website
 Neisse University Website
 Mechatronics Website

Technical University of Liberec
Liberec
Educational institutions established in 1953
Buildings and structures in Liberec
1953 establishments in Czechoslovakia